The International Congress for Victims of Terrorism is a congress for victims of terrorism worldwide. The Congress has a double objective: to provide a forum where the victims of terrorism can be heard; and to have their concerns and experiences recognised by society and civil authority.

History
The Congress was founded by the International Centre for Victims of Terrorism of the San Pablo.

The first Congress took place in Madrid, Spain in 2004. Subsequent Congresses were held in Bogotá, Colombia (2005), Valencia, Spain (2006), Madrid (2008), and Medellín, Colombia (2009) The 6th Congress took place February 11 – 13 2010 in Salamanca, Spain
The 7th International Congress of Victims of Terrorism took place 15–17 September 2011 in the amphitheatre Foch, Ecole Militaire, Paris, France.

References

International conferences
Terrorism